Xuluqoba (also, Khulug and Khulukhoba) is a village in the Qusar Rayon of Azerbaijan.  The village forms part of the municipality of Əniqoba.

References 

Populated places in Qusar District